Alphonse Francis Kamp (September 5, 1900 – February 25, 1955) is a former Major League Baseball pitcher. He played two seasons with the Boston Braves from 1924 to 1925.

References

External links

Boston Braves players
1900 births
1955 deaths
Baseball players from Massachusetts
Major League Baseball pitchers
Worcester Panthers players
Pittsfield Hillies players
Buffalo Bisons (minor league) players
Providence Grays players
New Haven Profs players
Richmond Byrds players